ALI may refer to:

 ALI (band), a multinational band from Shibuya, Japan
 Acer Laboratories Incorporated, IC manufacturer
 Acute limb ischemia, caused by sudden blood flow loss
 Acute lung injury
 Albion station (Michigan), U.S. (station code: ALI)
 Alice International Airport, Texas (IATA: ALI)
 American Law Institute
 Annual limit on intake of radiation
 Automatic Location Information, a database to locate emergency service caller

See also
 Ali (disambiguation)
 Ali (name)